The Quebec Emerald (Somatochlora brevicincta) is a species of dragonfly in the family Corduliidae. It is found in Canada and the United States. Its natural habitat is fens.

References

Corduliidae
Taxonomy articles created by Polbot
Insects described in 1954